The Lod Ganei Aviv railway station is a station in Lod, Israel on the Tel Aviv–Rishon LeZion line.

References 

Railway stations in Central District (Israel)
Railway stations opened in 2008
2008 establishments in Israel
Lod